Several special routes of U.S. Route 21 exist. In order from south to north they are as follows.

Existing

Beaufort business loop

U.S. Route 21 Business (US 21 Bus.) is a  business route in Beaufort that travels along Sea Island Parkway, Carteret Street, and Boundary Street.

Orangeburg business loop 2

U.S. Route 21 Business (US 21 Bus.) is a  business route of US 21. It begins at the intersection of US 21 and SC 4 and then traverses along parts of Charleston Highway and Magnolia Street, before ending at Chestnut Street (US 21).

Orangeburg connector route

U.S. Route 21 Connector (US 21 Conn.) is a  connector route of US 21 that is unsigned. It travels from Broughton Street (US 178 Bus.) to Chestnut Street (US 21/US 178), via Park Street and Columbia Road.

West Columbia connector route

U.S. Route 21 Connector (US 21 Conn.) is a  connector route of US 21 that exists entirely within the city limits of West Columbia. It connects US 21/US 176/US 321, from where they curve off of Charleston Highway and onto Knox Abbott Drive, with US 1. It shares the Charleston Highway name with US 21/US 176/US 321 and is an unsigned highway.

Columbia connector route

U.S. Route 21 Connector (US 21 Conn.) is a  connector route of US 21 that is an unsigned highway. It is located in the west-central part of Richland County and entirely within the city limits of Columbia in the U.S. state of South Carolina. It connects US 21/US 176/US 321 with US 76/US 378. It is concurrent with US 76 Conn. for its entire length.

It begins at an intersection with US 21/US 176/US 321 (Blossom Street/Huger Street). It travels to the east-northeast on Blossom Street. It crosses over some railroad tracks of CSX. It passes Greek Village, the fraternities and sororities of the University of South Carolina (USC). Right after passing the Carolina Coliseum, it intersects South Carolina Highway 48 (SC 48; Assembly Street). The highway passes the Carolina Community Garden at the Honors Residence Hall. Then, it passes the Thomas Cooper Library and then the Booker T. Washington Auditorium. It curves to the northeast and travels along the northwestern edge of Maxcy Gregg Park. This is southeast of the USC tennis courts at Blossom Street. The connector curves to the east and travels under a railroad bridge that carries railroad tracks of Norfolk Southern Railway. It curves to the southeast. At the intersection with Saluda Avenue, the highway turns left and travels to the northeast. One block later, at Devine Street, it turns right and travels to the east-northeast. At an intersection with Harden Street, it curves to the east-southeast and travels through a retail area before meeting its northern terminus, an intersection with US 76/US 378 (Millwood Avenue/Devine Street).

Ridgeway connector route

U.S. Route 21 Connector (US 21 Conn.) is a connector route that partially travels through the western part of Ridgeway, which is in the southeastern part of Fairfield County. It is known as Coleman Highway and is an unsigned highway. It begins at an intersection with US 21 just southeast of Ridgeway. It travels to the northwest and enters the town. It then curves to the west-northwest before leaving the city limits. Then, it curves to the west before reaching its northern terminus, an intersection with South Carolina Highway 34 (SC 34).

Fort Mill business loop

U.S. Route 21 Business (US 21 Bus.) traverses through downtown Fort Mill, via Spratt Street, White Street, Old Nation Road, and Springfield Parkway.

Elkin business loop

U.S. Route 21 Business (US 21 Bus.) traverses through downtown Jonesville and Elkin, via Main Street and Bridge Street.  The route was established after the mainline was realigned east along a completed section of I-77.

Sparta truck route

U.S. Route 21 Truck (US 21 Truck) is an alternate route for trucks to bypass the downtown central business district and allows truck traffic to travel on and off of NC 18. The  route follows along the Sparta Parkway, which bypasses west from mainline US 21, connecting with Grandview Drive and West Whitehead Street (NC 18).

Former

Orangeburg business loop 1

U.S. Route 21 Business (US 21 Bus.) originally traversed along Broughton Street (in concurrency with US 178 Bus), Park Street, and Columbia Road.  In 1967, the business loop was decommissioned after the establishment of the second business loop through Orangeburg; the old alignment continues as US 178 Bus (Broughton Street) and US 21 Conn (Park Street and Columbia Street).

Rock Hill business loop

U.S. Route 21 Business (US 21 Bus.) originally traversed along Main Street, Albright Road, Black Street, Oakland Avenue, and Cherry Road, through downtown Rock Hill. It was decommissioned at the request of Rock Hill to gain ownership and maintenance oversight from the state.

Bluefield bypass route

U.S. Route 21 Business (US 21 Bus.) originally traveled through downtown Bluefield utilizing Bluefield Avenue and Princeton Avenue, but as U.S. Route 21 no longer serves north of Wytheville, Virginia, there is not a U.S. Route 21 Business. Prior to the Interstate Highway system, US 21 ran from Ohio to Florida. Once Interstate 77 was built, there was no longer a need for US 21 and it made its terminus Wytheville, Virginia.

See also
 
 
 List of special routes of the United States Numbered Highway System

References

External links
 

 
21
21
21
21
21